Florencia Giorgi (born ) is an Argentine volleyball player. She is part of the Argentina women's national volleyball team.

She participated in the 2011 FIVB Volleyball Girls' U18 World Championship, 2017 FIVB Volleyball World Grand Prix, and 2017 Montreux Volley Masters.
At club level she played for Union Oncativo in 2017.

References

External links 

 FIVB profile

1995 births
Living people
Argentine women's volleyball players
Place of birth missing (living people)